The following is a list of convention and exhibition centers by country.

Andorra 
 Andorra Convention Centre (Andorra la Vella)

Argentina

Buenos Aires 
 Buenos Aires Exhibition and Convention Center U/C
 Costa Salguero
 La Rural 
 Sheraton Buenos Aires Hotel & Convention Center

Córdoba 
 Córdoba Civic and Convention Center

Rosario, Santa Fe 
 City Center Rosario
 Patio de la Madera

Salta 
 Salta Convention Center

San Fernando del Valle de Catamarca,Catamarca 
 Predio Ferial Campo Las Heras

Santiago del Estero 
 Forum Santiago del Estero

Australia 
 Adelaide Convention Centre (Adelaide, South Australia)
 Adelaide Event and Exhibition Centre
 Alice Springs Convention Centre
 Australian Turf Club
 Barossa Arts and Convention Centre
 Brisbane Convention & Exhibition Centre (South Brisbane, Queensland)
 Cairns Convention Centre
 Darwin Convention Centre (Darwin, Northern Territory)
 Embassy Ballroom & Function Centre
 Geelong Conference Centre
 Gladstone Entertainment Convention Centre (Gladstone, Queensland)
 Gold Coast Convention and Exhibition Centre (Broadbeach (a suburb of Gold Coast), Queensland)
 Hahndorf Resort & Convention Centre
 International Convention Centre Sydney (Sydney, New South Wales)
 Launceston Conference Centre Tasmania
 La Mirage Reception and Convention Centre
 Mackay Entertainment & Convention Centre
 Melbourne Convention & Exhibition Centre (South Wharf (a suburb of Melbourne), Victoria)
 Perth Convention & Exhibition Centre (Perth, Western Australia)
 Royal Exhibition Building (Melbourne, Victoria)
 Royal International Convention Centre (Brisbane, Queensland)

Austria 

 Austria Center Vienna (part of Vienna International Centre)
 Wiener Stadthalle 
 Hofburg Vienna
 Messe Wien

Barbados 
 Lloyd Erskine Sandiford Conference and Cultural Centre (formerly Sherbourne) (Two Mile Hill, St. Michael, Barbados)

Belgium 
 Brussels Expo
 Flanders Expo
 Sportpaleis, (Antwerp) 
 Flanders Meeting & Convention Center Antwerp
 Grenslandhallen (Hasselt)
 Kortrijk Xpo
 Square – Brussels Meeting Centre
 Tour & Taxis

Botswana 
 Gaborone international convention center
 Peermont Walmont at the Grand Palm Hotel Casino and Convention Resort
 Cresta lodge
 AVANI Gaborone Resort & Casino
 Crossgold Conference
 Tlotlo hotel and conference center
 Phakalane Golf estate
 Ditshupo
 Gaborone fair grounds
 Botswana Investment and Trade Centre

Brazil 
 Anhembi Convention Center (São Paulo)
 Marista Hall (Belo Horizonte)
 Riocentro (Rio de Janeiro)
 WTC Events Center (São Paulo)

Bulgaria 
 National Palace of Culture (Sofia)
 Exhibition Forum Events  (Sofia)

Canada

China

Shanghai 
 Shanghai Exhibition Centre
 Shanghai New International Expo Center
 Shanghai International Convention Center
 Shanghai Urban Planning Exhibition Center
 National Exhibition and Convention Center (Shanghai)

Beijing 
 Beijing Exhibition Center
 China International Exhibition Center
 China National Convention Center

Other Cities 
 New Century Global Center (Chengdu)
 Chenzhou International Convention and Exhibition Centre
 Guangzhou International Convention and Exhibition Center
 Hainan International Convention And Exhibition Center (Haikou)
 Harbin International Conference Exhibition and Sports Center
 Nanjing International Exhibition Center
 Shenyang New World Expo
 Shenzhen Convention and Exhibition Center
 Suzhou International Expo Center
 Convention and Exhibition Center (Tianjin)
 Xian Greenland Pico International Convention and Exhibition Center

Colombia 
 Centro de Convenciones de Cartagena de Indias
 Centro de Eventos Valle del Pacifico
 Corferias

Czech Republic 
 Brno Exhibition Centre (Brno)
 Výstaviště Praha

Denmark 
 Forum Copenhagen (Copenhagen)
 Bella Center (Copenhagen)
 Messecenter Herning (Herning)

Finland 
 Dipoli (Espoo)
 Helsinki Exhibition and Convention Centre
 Tampere Exhibition and Convention Centre
 Turku Exhibition and Convention Centre
 Wanha Satama (Helsinki)

France 
 Paris Expo Porte de Versailles
 Parc des Expositions de Villepinte
 Center of New Industries and Technologies (CNIT) (Paris)
 Disney Business Solutions (Paris)
 Maison de la Mutualité (Paris)
 Palais des Congrès Acropolis (Nice)
 Palais des Congrès de Paris
 Palais des Festivals et des Congrès (Cannes)
 Strasbourg Convention & Exhibition Centre

Georgia

Tbilisi 
 ExpoGeorgia Co.

Germany

Baden-Württemberg 
 Stuttgart
 Stuttgart Trade Fair

Bavaria 
 Munich
 Messe München
 Nürnberg (Nuremberg)
 Messe Nürnberg

Berlin 
 Berlin ExpoCenter Airport
 Internationales Congress Centrum Berlin (Charlottenburg-Wilmersdorf)
 Messe Berlin
 Palace of the Republic
 Berliner Congress Center

Hamburg 
 Congress Center Hamburg
 Hamburg Messe

Hesse 

 Frankfurt
 Messe Frankfurt

Lower Saxony 
 Hannover
 Hanover Fairground

North Rhine-Westphalia 
 Cologne (Köln)
 Flora und Botanischer Garten Köln (Nippes, Cologne)
 Gürzenich (Innenstadt, Cologne)
 Koelnmesse – Cologne Trade Fair (Deutz, Cologne)
 Lanxess Arena (Deutz)
 Rheinterrassen (Deutz)
 Staatenhaus (Deutz)
 Dortmund
 Westfalenhallen
 Düsseldorf
 Düsseldorf Congress Sport & Event (Stockum)
 Messe Düsseldorf and Esprit Arena (Stockum)
 Mitsubishi Electric Halle (Bilk)
 Museum Kunstpalast (Pempelfort)
 Station Airport (Lohausen)

Münster
 Halle Münsterland

Saxony 
Leipzig
 Leipzig Trade Fair

Ghana 
 Pentecost Convention Centre

Hong Kong SAR 
 AsiaWorld–Expo (Chek Lap Kok)
 Hong Kong Convention and Exhibition Centre (Hong Kong Island)
 Kowloonbay International Trade & Exhibition Centre

India

Andhra Pradesh 

 Sree Convention Centre (Eluru)
 A1 Convention Centre (Vijayawada)
 24K Golden Events Convention Centre (Vijayawada)
 Vizag Conventions (Visakhapatnam)
 AU Convention Center (Visakhapatnam)
 Kala Bharati (Visakhapatnam)

Bihar 
 Patna International Convention Centre (Patna)
 Shri Krishna Memorial Hall (Patna)
 Rajgir International Convention Centre (Rajgir)

Gujarat 
 Gujarat University Convention & Exhibition Centre, Managed By Lallooji & Sons (Ahmedabad)
 Mahatma Mandir (Gandhinagar)
 Shree Shakthi Greens Managed by Mr. Durgesh Agarwal, Smt. Kanika Agarwal, Shri. Anil Agarwal, Smt. Usha Agarwal (Ahmedabad)
 Surat International Exhibition and Convention Centre (Surat)

Jammu and Kashmir 
University of Kashmir Convocation Complex (Srinagar)
Sher-e-Kashmir International Convention Centre (Srinagar)
General Zorawar Singh Auditorium (Jammu)

Karnataka 
 Bangalore International Exhibition Centre (Bangalore)
 Bangalore Palace (Bangalore)
 TMA Pai International Convention Centre (Mangalore)

Kerala 
 Adlux International Convention & Exhibition Centre, Karukutty
 Ashis Convention Centre, Kalamassery Kochi
 LuLu Grand Hyatt International Convention Centre, Bolghatty Island Kochi
 Lulu Convention Centre, Thrissur
 Le Meridien International Convention Center, Cochin
 Crescent Convention Center, Chalakudy
 CIAL Trade Fair and Exhibition centre, Cochin
 MCP Convention Center, Irinjalakuda, Thrissur
 Cosmopolitan Convention Center, Kodungallur
 The Quilon Beach Hotel & Convention Centre, Kollam
 Travancore International Convention center
 Malabar Marina Convention Centre
 Al Saj Convention Centre (Trivandrum)
 International Conference Center (Thuravoor) (Angamali)
 Shifa Convention Center  (Perinthalmanna, Malappuram)
 Vythiri Village Convention Center (Vythiri, Wayanad)
 Vijaya International Convention Center (Thiruvalla, Pathanamthitta)
 Mikas Convention Centre (Kayamkulam)
 K. G. Convention Centre (Punalur)
 Thiruvambady Convention Centre, Thrissur
 Centre-A, Business Centre (Kochi)
 The Quilon Beach Hotel & Convention Centre, Kollam
 GAGO Convention Centre (Kadakkal quilon)
 Pearl Convention Centre, Vadasserikkonam
 LA Mirage Convention Center, Koratty
 Trans Asia Cyber Park, Business Center (Kochi)

Madhya Pradesh 
 Brilliant Convention Centre (Indore)

Maharashtra 
 Bombay Convention & Exhibition Centre (Mumbai)
 International Convention Centre, Pune
 The Orchid Hotel and Convention Centre, Pune

National Capital Region (NCR) 
 Annamalai University
 APICON 2015 – Conference Secretariat
 Awas Vikas Convention Center
 Bhaskaracharya College of Applied Sciences
 Centre for Linguistics
 Conference Venue
 Convention Center, JNU
 Design Public
 Epicentre
 The Executive Centre, Serviced Offices, Gurgaon, India
 Exhibition Cum Convention Centre
 Expocentre
 Habitat World
 Hilton Garden Inn, Gurgaon Baani Square
 The Icon Motel
 India Convention And Culture Center Pvt Ltd.
 India Expo Centre and Mart (Greater Noida)
 India Exposition Mart Ltd.
 India Habitat Centre (New Delhi)
 India International Centre
 Inter-University Accelerator Centre
 Manekshaw Centre
 NCUI Auditorium & Convention Centre
 NDMC Convention Centre
 Paharpur Business Centre
 Palika Sadan
 Petrotech
 The Phoolwari
 Pragati Maidan (New Delhi)
 Pratham Convention Centre (proposed)
 Ramada Gurgaon Central
 Royal Orchid Hotels
 Scope
 Shakuntalam Theatre
 Taurus Hotel & Conventions
 Tilyar Convention Center
 University of Delhi North Campus Conference Centre
 Vigyan Bhavan (New Delhi)
 West End Convention Centre

Rajasthan 
 Jaipur Exhibition and Convention Centre

Tamil Nadu 
 PSG Convention Center, Coimbatore. "Indian's Finest International Convention Center"
 Chennai Trade Centre
 Codissia Trade Fair, Coimbatore; "Asia's Largest Pillar Free Hall"

Telangana 
 Veda Convention Centre (Adibatla) (Hyderabad)
 HITEX Exhibition Center (Hyderabad)
 Hyderabad International Convention Centre (HICC) (Hyderabad)
 N Convention Centre, Hitec City (Hyderabad)
 J R C Convention Centre, Film Nagar, Jubilee Hills, (Hyderabad)

West Bengal 
 International Financial Hub Convention Centre (Kolkata)
 Biswa Bangla Convention Center, New Town (Kolkata)
 Milan Mela Prangan (Kolkata)
 Nazrul Mancha (Kolkata)
 Science City (Kolkata)
 Sukanta Mancha (Kolkata)

Indonesia

Bali
 Bali International Convention Center (Bali)

Banten
 Indonesia Convention Exhibition (Tangerang, Banten)

East Java
 Dyandra Convention Center (Surabaya, East Java)
 Grand City Convention Center (Surabaya, East Java)

Jakarta
 Jakarta Convention Center (Senayan, Central Jakarta)
 Jakarta International Expo (JIExpo) (Kemayoran, Central Jakarta)

North Sumatra
 Medan International Convention Center (Medan, North Sumatra)

Riau
 Labersa Grand Hotel and Convention Center (Pekanbaru, Riau)

West Kalimantan
 Balikpapan Sport & Convention Center (Balikpapan, East Kalimantan)

West Java
 Bandung Convention Center (Bandung, West Java)
 Sentul International Convention Center (Sentul City, Bogor, West Java)

South Sulawesi
 Celebes Convention Center (Makassar, South Sulawesi)

South Sumatra
 Palembang Sport and Convention Center (Palembang, South Sumatra)

Iran 
 EXHIBIRAN INTERNATIONAL  Shahr-e Aftab
 Kish International Conferences and Exhibitions Center
 Mashhad International Exhibition Center (Mashhad)
 Milad Tower
 Iran International Exhibitions Company, Tehran International Permanent Fairground
 IRIB International Conference Center
 Iran Mall exhibition center
 Isfahan Fair, Isfahan Province International Exhibition Co.
 Isfahan Imam Khamenei International Convention Center
 Isfahan City Center
 Tabriz International Exhibition Center, Tabriz

Ireland 
 Citywest Hotel & Conference Centre
 Convention Centre Dublin
 Royal Dublin Society

Israel 

 Haifa International Convention Center (Matam, Haifa)
 International Convention Center (Jerusalem)
 Israel Trade Fairs & Convention Center (Tel Aviv)

Italy 
 Palazzo delle Esposizioni (Rome)
 Torino Esposizioni (Turin)
 MiCo – Milano Congressi (Milan)
 Stella Polare Convention Centre, Fieramilano Rho (Milan)
 PalaExpo Venice (Venice)

Jamaica 
 Montego Bay Convention Centre (Montego Bay, Saint James)

Japan

Aichi 
 Nagoya Congress Center
 Nagoya International Exhibition Hall

Chiba 
 Makuhari Messe

Fukuoka 
 Fukuoka Convention Center
 Marine Messe Fukuoka

Gifu 
 Nagaragawa Convention Center

Hokkaido 
 Sapporo Convention Center
 Sapporo Ryūtsū Center

Kanagawa 
 Pacifico Yokohama

Kyoto 
 Kyoto International Conference Center

Niigata 
 Toki Messe

Okinawa 
 Okinawa Convention Center

Osaka 
 Intex Osaka
 Osaka International Convention Center

Tokyo 
 Tokyo Big Sight
 Tokyo International Forum

Jordan 
 King Hussein Bin Talal Convention Center

Kenya 
 Kenyatta International Conference Centre (Nairobi)

Korea, South 
 BEXCO Busan Exhibition and Convention Center (Busan)
 CECO Exhibition Convention Center (Changwon)
 COEX Convention & Exhibition Center (Seoul)
 EXCO Exhibition & Convention Center (Daegu)
 International Convention Center Jeju (Jeju)
 KDJC Kimdaejung Convention center (Gwangju)
 KINTEX Korea International Exhibition Center (Goyang)
 KOTREX Kotra Exhibition Center (Daejon)
 SETEC Seoul Trade Exhibition & Convention (Seoul)
 Songdo Convensia (Incheon)
 Ulsan Culture & Arts Center (Ulsan)

Laos 
 Lao International Trade Exhibition & Convention Center (Lao-ITECC) (Vientiane)
 Landmark Mekong Riverside Hotel & Convention Center, (Vientiane)

Luxembourg 
 Luxexpo The Box
 Cercle Municipal
 Kinneksbond
 Neumünster Abbey

Malaysia 
Ataria International Convention Centre at Bukit Gambang Resort City, Kuantan, Pahang
Ataria International Convention Centre, @ Borneo Samariang Resort City, Kuching, Sarawak
Calvary Convention Centre

 Dewan Canselor Tun Abdul Razak
 Mines Exhibition Center (Sri Kembangan, Kuala Lumpur)
 Mid Valley Exhibition Centre
 Borneo Convention Centre Kuching
 Connexion@Nexus (Bangsar South, Kuala Lumpur)
 Kuala Lumpur Convention Centre
 Subterranean Penang International Conference & Exhibition Center (SPICE)
 Penang Waterfront Convention Centre
 Malacca International Trade Centre
 Malaysia Agro Exposition Park Serdang
 Malaysia International Trade and Exhibition Centre (MITEC)
 MATRADE Exhibition and Convention Centre (MECC)
 Persada Johor
 Ipoh Convention Centre
 Putra World Trade Centre
 Putrajaya International Convention Centre
 Sabah International Convention Centre
 Setia City Convention Centre
 Shah Alam Convention Centre
 Ideal Convention Centre, Shah Alam

Malta 
 Mediterranean Conference Centre
 Malta Fairs & Conventions Centre

Mauritius 
 Swami Vivekananda International Convention Centre
 Trianon Convention Centre

Mexico 
 Auditorio Benito Juarez (Los Mochis)
 Centro de Convenciones de Tampico
 Centro de Convenciones y Exposiciones (Toluca)
 Cintermex (Monterrey)
 Expo Forum (Hermosillo)
 Inforum (Irapuato)
 Poliforum Chiapas
 Salon Teotihuacan (Acapulco)
 Yucatán Siglo XXI Convention Centre (Mérida, Yucatán)

Monaco 
 Grimaldi Forum

Nepal
International Convention Centre, Nepal
Godavari Sunrise Convention Center

Netherlands 
Amsterdam RAI Exhibition & Convention Center: 112,200 m²
Beurs van Berlage, Amsterdam: 18,000 m² (up to 1300 delegates)
 Rotterdam Ahoy, Rotterdam

New Zealand 
 Aotea Centre (Auckland)
 Christchurch Convention Centre (demolished in 2012, due to earthquake damage)
 Claudelands Arena (Hamilton)
 Michael Fowler Centre (Wellington)
 Mystery Creek Events Centre (Hamilton)
 TSB Bank Arena (Wellington)
 Viaduct Events Centre (Auckland)

Nigeria 
 Eko Convention Centre
 Calabar International Convention Centre
 Obi Wali International Conference Centre (Port Harcourt, Rivers State)

Norway 
 Telenor Arena (Oslo) 
 Oslofjord Convention Center (Stokke)

Pakistan 
 Aiwan-e-Iqbal (Lahore)
 Expo Centre Lahore
 Jinnah Convention Centre (Islamabad)
 Karachi Expo Centre
 Pak-China Friendship Centre (Islamabad)

Panama 
 Atlapa Convention Centre
 Figali Convention Center

Paraguay 
 Centro de Convenciones y Museo de la CONMEBOL (Asunción)
 Centro de Convenciones Mariscal López (Asunción)

Philippines 

 ADD Convention Center (Apalit, Pampanga)
 Balanghai Hotel and Convention Center (Butuan)
 Boracay Convention Center (Malay, Aklan)
 Bren Z. Guiao Convention Center (San Fernando, Pampanga)
 Cebu International Convention Center (Cebu City)
 IC3 Convention Center (Cebu City)
 Iloilo Convention Center (Iloilo City) 
 Negros Oriental Convention Center (Dumaguete)
 Philippine International Convention Center (Pasay, Metro Manila)
 Quezon Convention Center (Lucena, Quezon)
 SMX Convention Center (Pasay, Metro Manila)
 Megatrade Hall (Mandaluyong)
 SMX Convention Center Bacolod (Bacolod)
 SMX Convention Center Davao (Davao City)
 SMX Convention Center Aura (Taguig)
 Cebu Trade Hall (Cebu City) 
 Sky Hall (Cebu City)
 SMX Convention Center Olongapo (Olongapo)
 Subic Bay Convention Center (Olongapo)
 World Trade Center Metro Manila, (Pasay)

Portugal 
 Centro de Congressos da Alfândega do Porto / Alfândega Congress Centre (Porto)
 Altice Arena (Lisbon)
 Feira Internacional de Lisboa (Lisbon)
 Centro de Congressos de Lisboa (Lisbon)
 Centro de Congressos de Lisboa (Lisbon)
 Centro de Congressos do Estoril (Estoril)
 Centro de Congressos do Algarve (Vilamoura, Quarteira)

Puerto Rico

Romania 
 Caex (Bacau)
 Centrul Expozitional Iasi (Iasi)
 Expo Arad (Arad)
 Pavilionul Expozitional Mamaia (Constanta)
 Romexpo (Bucharest)
 Sala Palatului (Bucharest)
 The Multifunctional Center (Craiova)

Russia 
 All-Russia Exhibition Centre (Moscow)
 Crocus Expo (Moscow)
 Expocentre (Moscow)
 Makaryev Fair Exhibition Hall (Nizhny Novgorod)
 Moscow Gostiny Dvor
 Moscow Manege
 Saint Petersburg Manege
 Sokolniki Exhibition and Convention Centre (Moscow)

Rwanda 
 Kigali Convention Centre (Kigali)

Singapore 
 Changi Exhibition Centre
 Marina Bay Sands Expo and Convention Centre
 MAX Atria
 Raffles City Convention Centre
 Singapore Conference Hall
 Singapore Expo
 The Star Theatre – The Star Performing Arts Centre
 Suntec Singapore International Convention and Exhibition Centre
 UE Convention Centre

Slovenia 
 Brdo Castle near Kranj
 Cankar Hall (Ljubljana)
 Exhibition and Convention Centre (Ljubljana)

South Africa 
 Cape Town International Convention Centre
 CSIR International Convention Centre (Pretoria)
 Johannesburg Expo Centre (Nasrec)
 Gallagher Convention Centre (Midrand)
 Inkosi Albert Luthuli International Convention Centre (Durban)
 Nelson Mandela International Convention Center (Bloemfontein)

Spain 
 Palau de Congressos de Catalunya
 Centre de Convencions Internacional de Barcelona
 BEC - Bilbao Exhibition Centre
 Feria Valencia
 Fira de Barcelona
 La Llotja de Lleida
 Palacio de Congresos Kursaal (San Sebastián)
 World Trade Center Barcelona
 Feria de Zaragoza
 IFEMA

Sri Lanka 
 Bandaranaike Memorial International Conference Hall (Colombo)
 Sri Lanka Exhibition & Convention Centre (Colombo)
 Veerasingam Hall (Jaffna)

Sweden 
 Elmia (Jönköping)
 Malmömässan (Malmö)
 Norra Latin (Stockholm)
 Rosvalla Nyköping Eventcenter
 Stockholm International Fairs
 Stockholm Waterfront
 Svenska Mässan (Gothenburg)

Switzerland 
 Congress Center Basel (Basel)
 Davos Congress Centre
 Eulachhalle (Winterthur)
 Palais de Beaulieu (Lausanne)
 Palexpo (Geneva)
 Swiss Convention Centres
 SwissTech Convention Center (Lausanne)

Taiwan 

 Greater Taichung International Expo Center
 Kaohsiung Exhibition Center
 Taipei International Convention Center
 Taipei Nangang Exhibition Center
 Taipei World Trade Center

Tanzania 

 Arusha International Conference Centre (Arusha)
 Dar es Salaam International Conference Centre (Dar es Salaam)
 Julius Nyerere International Convention Centre (Dar es Salaam)
 Tanga International Conference Centre (Tanga)

Thailand 
 Bangkok Convention Center Ladprao (CentralPlaza Lardprao, Bangkok)
 Bangkok International Trade and Exhibition Centre
 Centara Grand and Bangkok Convention Centre (CentralWorld, Bangkok)
 Chiang Mai International Exhibition and Convention Centre (Chiang Mai)
 Impact, Muang Thong Thani (Nonthaburi)
 Pattaya Exhibition and Convention Hall (Pattaya)
 Queen Sirikit National Convention Center (Bangkok)
 Thailand Cultural Centre (Bangkok)

Turkey 
 Antalya Cultural Center
 Ephesus Convention Center (Kusadasi)
 Glass Pyramid Sabancı Congress and Exhibition Center (Antalya)
 Istanbul Lutfi Kirdar – ICEC
 Mersin Congress and Exhibition Center
 World Trade Center Istanbul

Ukraine 
 ACCO International (Kyiv)
 Expocenter of Ukraine (Kyiv)
 International Exhibition Centre (Kyiv)
 KyivExpoPlaza (Berezivka)
 Parkovyi (Kyiv)
 Ukrainian House (Kyiv)

United Arab Emirates 
 Abu Dhabi National Exhibitions Company
 Dubai International Convention Centre
 Expo Centre Sharjah
 JAFZA One Convention Centre

United Kingdom

Aberdeen 
 Aberdeen Exhibition and Conference Centre

Belfast 
 King's Hall, Belfast
 Titanic Belfast
 Waterfront Hall

Birmingham 
 International Convention Centre
 National Exhibition Centre
 National Indoor Arena

Bournemouth 
 Bournemouth International Centre

Brighton 
 Brighton Centre

Cardiff 
 Wales Millennium Centre

Cheltenham 
 Cheltenham Racecourse

Edinburgh 
 Edinburgh International Conference Centre

Glasgow 
 Scottish Exhibition and Conference Centre
 The SSE Hydro

Harrogate 
 Harrogate International Centre

Liverpool 
 ACC Liverpool
 BT Convention Centre
 Exhibition Centre Liverpool

London 
 10-11 Carlton House Terrace
 Alexandra Palace
 Business Design Centre
 BMA House
 Central Hall Westminster
 Congress Centre (at Congress House)
 County Hall
 Croydon Arena
 Earls Court Exhibition Centre
 ExCeL London
 Olympia
 One Great George Street
 Queen Elizabeth II Conference Centre
 Wembley Arena
 W12 Conferences

Lisburn 
 Eikon Exhibition Centre

Loughborough 
 Burleigh Court Hotel and Conference Centre
 Holywell Park Conference Centre

Manchester 
 EventCity
 Manchester Arena
 Manchester Central Convention Complex

Newcastle 
 Utilita Arena Newcastle

Nottingham 
 East Midlands Conference Centre
 Nottingham Conference Centre

Sheffield 
 Octagon Centre
 Sheffield City Hall

Telford 
 Telford International Centre

United States

Vietnam 

 Aryana Convention Center (Danang)
 Crown Convention Center (Nha Trang)
 Saigon Exhibition and Convention Center (Ho Chi Minh City)
 Vietnam National Convention Center (Hanoi)

 The Adora - The Leader of Conventions & Weddings in Ho Chi Minh City website=http://theadora.vn/

See also 
 List of convention centers named after people

References

External links 
 Convention Center Calendar of Events

Lists of buildings and structures
Lists of tourist attractions